Amyipunga barbarae is a species of beetle in the family Cerambycidae. It was described by Schmid in 2011.

References

Clytini
Beetles described in 2011